This is a list of episodes for the first season of the CBS-TV series Alice.

Broadcast history
The first episode originally aired Tuesday, August 31, 1976, at 9:30-10:00 pm (EST). The rest of the season aired Wednesdays at 9:30-10:00 pm (EST) from September 29 to October 27, 1976 and Saturdays at 9:30-10:00 pm (EST) from November 6, 1976 to March 26, 1977.

Episodes

References

1976 American television seasons
1977 American television seasons